Donald R. "Don" Lusk (October 28, 1913 – December 30, 2018) was an American animator and director.

Early life 
Lusk was born on October 28, 1913, in Burbank, a suburb of Los Angeles, California. He served in the United States Marines during World War II.

Career 
Lusk was hired by The Walt Disney Company in 1933 as an Inbetweener. He was 20 at the time. His first film as an animator was 1938's Ferdinand the Bull adapted from 1936's The Story of Ferdinand by author Munro Leaf. He worked on Snow White and the Seven Dwarfs, Pinocchio, Fantasia, Bambi, Song of the South, Melody Time, So Dear to My Heart, The Adventures of Ichabod and Mr. Toad, Cinderella, Alice in Wonderland, Peter Pan, Lady and the Tramp, Sleeping Beauty and One Hundred and One Dalmatians. 

Lusk left Disney in 1960, but continued to work as an animator during the 1960s and 1970s. Aside from animation, Lusk also directed multiple cartoon films and series, including the Peanuts TV specials and movies and for the Hanna-Barbera studio. His work at the latter included The Flintstones, The Jetsons, Scooby-Doo, The Smurfs, and Tom and Jerry.

In the early 1990s, Lusk retired after a career which spanned some 60 years.

Personal life and death 
Lusk married Marge Lusk, who worked in the Personnel Department of Disney Studios in Burbank. The couple had two children. He died on December 30, 2018, in San Clemente, California, aged 105. Long time friend, Navah-Paskowitz Asner, announced the news of his death on social media.

Filmography

References

External links 
 
 Audio interview with Don Lusk at The Animation Guild

1913 births
2018 deaths
People from Los Angeles County, California
Animators from California
American television directors
American centenarians
Men centenarians
Walt Disney Animation Studios people
Hanna-Barbera people
Walter Lantz Productions people
United States Marine Corps personnel of World War II